Castle is an American crime mystery/comedy-drama television series that aired on ABC for a total of eight seasons from March 9, 2009, to May 16, 2016. The series was produced jointly by Beacon Pictures and ABC Studios. 

Created by Andrew W. Marlowe, it primarily traces the lives of Richard Castle (Nathan Fillion), a best-selling mystery novelist, and Kate Beckett (Stana Katic), a homicide detective, as they solve various unusual crimes in New York City. Detective Beckett is initially infuriated at the thought of working with a writer and goes to great lengths to keep him out of her way. However, the two soon start developing feelings for each other. The overarching plot of the series focused on the romance between the two lead characters and their ongoing investigation of the murder of Beckett's mother. 

On May 12, 2016, it was announced that despite some cast members signing one-year contracts for a potential ninth season, the show was canceled.

Premise
Richard Castle (Fillion) is a famous mystery novelist. Bored and suffering from writer's block, he kills off Derrick Storm, the main character in his successful book series. He is brought in by the New York Police Department for questioning regarding a copycat murder based on one of his novels, where he meets and becomes intrigued by Kate Beckett (Katic), the detective assigned to the case. Castle is inspired to take Beckett as his muse for Nikki Heat, the main character of his next book series, and uses his friendship with the mayor to force the police to let him shadow Beckett. Castle's exuberant man-child personality clashes with Beckett's more reserved and professional demeanor. However, as Beckett begins to appreciate Castle's assistance in helping her catch killers, the two eventually become friends and then lovers. Their cases often deal with murders occurring within various unusual subcultures or milieus, including reality TV shows, vampire enthusiasts, a science-fiction convention, and a man who claims to be a time traveler. A recurring plotline deals with the unsolved murder of Beckett's mother years before, an investigation that leads to an increasingly sprawling, and dangerous, conspiracy. The series also focuses on the backstories of supporting characters like Detective Javier Esposito, Detective Kevin Ryan, Medical Examiner Lanie Parish, Captain Roy Montgomery, and Captain Victoria Gates, through multiple episodes.

Cast and characters

Main
 Nathan Fillion as Richard Castle, born Richard Alexander Rodgers, a best-selling mystery writer, who shadows and assists the NYPD. Castle is the only son of actress Martha Rodgers and a man known as Jackson Hunt, and also the father of Alexis Castle. He is the partner of Detective Kate Beckett. Castle's unusual theories sometimes irritate his coworkers, but often help solve the case. Richard has a complicated relationship with Detective Beckett. He is raising his daughter by himself, and his mother lives rent-free in his loft. 
 Stana Katic as Katherine "Kate" Beckett, an NYPD homicide detective and later, captain. Beckett is a daughter of Jim and Johanna Beckett. She was raised in Manhattan. She was inspired to be a detective by of her mother’s murder. She works with fellow detectives Javier Esposito and Kevin Ryan and medical examiner Lanie Parish, who is her best friend. In the beginning, Beckett's relationship with Castle is strained, but after a while, Kate and Richard start to understand each other.
 Jon Huertas as Detective Javier "Javi" Esposito, a former Army Special Forces soldier who now works in the homicide division as part of Beckett's team
 Seamus Dever as Detective Kevin Ryan, a former narcotics detective who works as part of Beckett's team. He is best friends with his partner, Detective Esposito. 
 Tamala Jones as Dr. Lanie Parish, a medical examiner, a friend of Beckett, and an on-again-off-again love interest for Esposito
 Ruben Santiago-Hudson as Captain Roy Montgomery (seasons 1–3; guest season 6), Beckett's boss and captain of the 12th Precinct
 Molly Quinn as Alexis Castle, Castle's daughter by his first wife, Meredith.
 Susan Sullivan as Martha Rodgers, Castle's mother, an actress on and off Broadway.
 Penny Johnson Jerald as Captain Victoria Gates (seasons 4–7), Captain Montgomery's replacement, formerly with Internal Affairs.
 Toks Olagundoye as Hayley Shipton (season 8), a quick-witted, free-spirited former Metropolitan Police Service officer and MI6 operative from Britain who now works as a security specialist.

Recurring
 Arye Gross as Dr. Sidney Perlmutter, a medical examiner who assists on some of Beckett's cases and does little to hide his dislike of Castle
 Scott Paulin as Jim Beckett, Kate Beckett's father
 Maya Stojan as Tory Ellis, an NYPD Tech officer who assists on Beckett's cases
 Juliana Dever as Jenny Ryan (née O'Malley), Ryan's wife (And Seamus Dever's real wife) 
 Darby Stanchfield as Meredith Harper, an actress who was Castle's first wife and Alexis's mother. She is regularly portrayed as self-centered and dramatic. 
 Monet Mazur as Gina Cowell, Castle's publisher and second wife
 Bailey Chase as Will Sorenson, an FBI agent and Beckett's ex-boyfriend
 Michael Trucco as Detective Tom Demming, a handsome robbery detective with whom Beckett briefly becomes involved
 Victor Webster as Dr. Josh Davidson, Beckett's motorcycle-riding, cardiac-surgeon ex-boyfriend
 Michael Mosley as Jerry Tyson/the Triple Killer (3XK), a methodical and meticulous serial killer who returns to New York every few years to terrorize the city. He is frequently believed to be dead, only to return again.
 Jack Coleman as William Bracken, a popular, charismatic, and murderously corrupt US Senator representing the State of New York with ambitions of one day becoming president.
 Geoff Pierson as Mr. Smith, a friend of Captain Montgomery's who holds evidence that keeps the murderer of Beckett's mother away from her
 Michael Dorn as Dr. Carver Burke, a psychiatrist who helps Beckett overcome her shooting and also deal with her various hidden emotions
 Jonathan Adams as Vulcan Simmons, a ruthless Manhattan drug lord
 Dan Castellaneta as Judge Markway, a judge who frequently issues warrants for Beckett, and one of Castle's poker buddies
 Phil LaMarr as Dr. Holloway, a psychiatrist who evaluates the mental stability of suspects
 Ken Baumann as Ashley, Alexis' steady boyfriend
 Myko Olivier as Pi, Alexis's boyfriend (at the beginning of season six) with whom she shares an apartment for a while
 Lisa Edelstein as Agent Rachel McCord, Beckett's partner during her brief time working for the Attorney-General's Office
 Annie Wersching as Dr Kelly Nieman, a respected plastic surgeon with a secret life as Jerry Tyson's partner in crime
 Matt Letscher as 'Henry Jenkins' (real name unknown), an impostor purportedly with the CIA who is involved with Castle's disappearance 
 Sunkrish Bala as Vikram Singh (season 8), a high-strung tech analyst with the Attorney General's office in Washington, D.C., where Beckett briefly works. He later works as a computer analyst for the NYPD. 
 Kristoffer Polaha as Caleb Brown, an idealistic public defender found to have links to the LokSat conspiracy. 
 James Brolin as Jackson Hunt, an operative of the Special Activities Center of the CIA, and who is Castle's father.
Real-life writers Stephen J. Cannell, James Patterson, Dennis Lehane, and Michael Connelly appear as themselves during periodic games of poker at Castle's apartment. Typically, they discuss Castle and Beckett's current case and tease Castle about his involvement with Beckett. Following Cannell's death on September 30, 2010, an empty chair was kept at the poker table for a year in his honor.

Broadcast history

Castle premiered as a midseason replacement on ABC on March 9, 2009. ABC renewed Castle for a second season with an initial order of 13 episodes (later extended to 24 episodes). The second season premiered on Monday, September 21, 2009. In March 2010, ABC renewed Castle for a third, 22-episode season, which began on September 20, 2010. On November 11, 2010, ABC extended the episode order to 24. On January 10, 2011, ABC announced Castle had been renewed for a fourth season for 22 episodes. Season four premiered on September 19, 2011. On December 8, 2011, ABC ordered an additional episode bringing season 4 up to 23 episodes.

On May 10, 2012, Castle was renewed for a fifth season by ABC, which started on Monday September 24, 2012. Two additional episodes were ordered on October 19, 2012, and February 5, 2013, respectively, which brought season 5 up to a total of 24 episodes. On May 10, 2013, ABC announced via Twitter that Castle had been renewed for a sixth season. On May 8, 2014, ABC renewed the series for a seventh season, which premiered on September 29, 2014.  On May 7, 2015, the series was renewed for its eighth season, which premiered on September 21, 2015. On April 18, 2016, ABC and ABC Productions announced that Stana Katic and Tamala Jones would not return for Castles ninth season, should it be renewed. Despite several other cast members having signed on for a ninth season, on May 12, 2016, it was announced that the show would be cancelled instead; the final episode aired on May 16, 2016.

Reception

U.S. Nielsen ratings

Awards and nominations

Other media

DVD releases

Streaming
On October 6, 2021, every episode became available on Hulu.

Syndication
In June 2011, TNT acquired exclusive cable rights from Disney-ABC Domestic Television to air the first two seasons of Castle beginning in the summer of 2012. In advance of the series' fourth season, TNT broadcast an eight-hour marathon of episodes on September 15, 2011, including five from season 3.  Castle began airing on TNT every Wednesday beginning September 26, 2012.  Castle also began airing in broadcast syndication on weekends beginning September 29, 2012, but then in the fall of 2022, Castle is currently airing reruns on MyNetworkTV. 

Castle then joins Ion Television’s lineup, starting on August 6, 2013. It aired every Tuesday morning until June 1, 2019, since it moved to Saturday mornings before back-to-back episodes and reruns of Law & Order: Special Victims Unit, all the way through until January 2021; it was moved to Thursday nights at 9:00 pm after repeat episodes of Chicago P.D. for the rest of the Ion Television lineup.

The series joined Lifetime lineup beginning on October 5, 2021.

Tie-in works

In the series, Castle writes a novel titled Heat Wave. As a tie-in, ABC and sister publisher Hyperion Books released that novel as a real book with "Richard Castle" as the author. It is entirely in character, from the dedication to the acknowledgments, although the latter mentions the principal cast and the show's creators by first name. ABC released the first half of the novel in weekly increments on their website. The complete novel was published in September 2009 as a hardcover, debuting at No. 26 on The New York Times Best Seller list. In its fourth week on the list, Heat Wave broke into the top 10 at No. 6. Heat Wave was released in paperback on July 27, 2010, and debuted at No. 34 on The New York Times Best Seller Paperback Mass-Market list. It once again appeared on The New York Times Best Seller list on May 27, 2012, at No. 19.

Naked Heat, the sequel to Heat Wave, was released on September 28, 2010. Naked Heat debuted at No. 7 on The New York Times Best Seller list. As they did with Heat Wave, ABC released a series of the early chapters online as a promotional tool. A third novel, titled Heat Rises, was released on September 20, 2011. It debuted at No. 1 on The New York Times Best Seller list on October 9, 2011 and at No. 5 on the USA TODAY Best-Selling Books list.

The season three finale introduced a graphic novel based on Castle's previous novel character, Derrick Storm. Castle: Richard Castle's Deadly Storm was published by Marvel Comics on September 28, 2011. It debuted at No. 3 on The New York Times Best Seller list on October 16, 2011. This has been followed by three more graphic novels, published a year apart. 

A fourth novel, titled Frozen Heat, was released on September 11, 2012, and debuted on The New York Times Best Seller list at No. 7 on September 23, 2012. The fifth Nikki Heat novel Deadly Heat was released September 17, 2013 and debuted at No. 8 on The New York Times Best Seller list. Raging Heat, the sixth novel, was released on September 16, 2014. It landed on No. 6 on The New York Times Hardcover Fiction Best Seller list and on No. 17 on The New York Times Combined Print and E-Book Fiction bestseller list on October 5, 2014. The seventh novel, Driving Heat, was released on September 15, 2015. It debuted on The New York Times Hardcover Fiction Best Seller list at No. 13 on October 4, 2015.

On May 20, 2016, it was announced that two more novels would be published in the Nikki Heat series, even though the show itself had been canceled. The eighth book in the series, High Heat, was published on October 25, 2016. The ninth, Heat Storm, was released in May 2017.

In July 2018 a 10th Nikki Heat book was announced. Crashing Heat was published by Kingswell, a division of Disney Books, on March 12, 2019, almost three years after the TV series ended.

In February 2012, Hyperion announced three e-book novellas as part of Richard Castle's famous Derrick Storm series. The first novella of the series, A Brewing Storm, was released in digital media on May 1, 2012. It debuted at No. 13 on The New York Times E-Book Fiction Best Seller list, as well as No. 18 on The New York Times Combine Prints & E-book Fiction list on May 20, 2012. On July 3, 2012, the second novella of the new Derrick Storm books, A Raging Storm, was released in e-book format. It landed on The New York Times Best Seller e-books list at #19 and at No. 31 for the combined Prints & E-book list, both on July 22, 2012. The final Derrick Storm novella, A Bloody Storm, was released on August 7, 2012. It debuted on The New York Times Best Seller e-books list at #20 and at #34 on the combined Prints & E-book list on August 26, 2012.

Video game
Castle: Never Judge a Book by its Cover was released on July 9, 2013. The game was available on Steam and could be downloaded on most mobile devices. It is no longer available for download. Players work with Castle and Beckett to find clues and stop a serial killer.

Derrick Storm television series
On August 20, 2014, ABC announced that the early development stage had begun on a television series centered on Derrick Storm. The series was to have been a CIA procedural written by Gregory Poirier, who was to have executive-produced it with Castles Andrew Marlowe and Terri Miller. There were no subsequent announcements about a Derrick Storm TV series, indicating that development had concluded.

References

External links

 
 
 Castle at TV by the Numbers

 
American detective television series
2009 American television series debuts
2016 American television series endings
2000s American comedy-drama television series
2000s American crime drama television series
2000s American mystery television series
2000s American police comedy television series
2010s American comedy-drama television series
2010s American crime drama television series
2010s American mystery television series
2010s American police comedy television series
American Broadcasting Company original programming
English-language television shows
Fictional portrayals of the New York City Police Department
Television series by ABC Studios
Television shows filmed in Los Angeles
Television shows about writers
Television shows set in New York City